Michael Bennett Medline (born July 4, 1963) is a Canadian businessman. In January 2017, Medline was named president and CEO of Empire Company Limited, a Canadian company whose core businesses includes food retailing, conducted through wholly owned Sobeys Inc., and related real estate.

Medline is also known as the former president and chief executive officer of Canadian Tire Corporation.
Medline was named president of Canadian Tire in November 2013, and succeeded  Stephen Wetmore as CEO of Canadian Tire Corp. in December 2014. Previously, Medline was responsible for many of the company’s biggest acquisitions, including Mark's in February 2002, the Forzani Group in August 2011, and the acquisition of Pro Hockey Life  in August 2013. On July 13, 2016, it was announced the board of directors voted to remove Medline, bringing back former CEO Stephen Wetmore.

Background

Medline was born in Toronto, and attended Huron University College at the University of Western Ontario in London, Ontario. Medline received an MBA from the College of William and Mary in Virginia and an LL.B. from the University of Toronto.

Medline began his career in Sobey Inc. with a string of massive layoffs, the first in the companies history. This along with other decisions were marketed to investors as “Project Sunrise” where they claimed to have saved money through streamlining efficiencies. The realization of these efficiencies were reflected in their Financial Statements although many question the true affect to the companies Cash Flow.

Other positions

Medline currently serves on the board of governors for Huron University, The BlackNorth Initiative and the SickKids Foundation. Medline is also the chairman of The Grocery Foundation and a member of the board of The Sobey Foundation.

References

1963 births
Living people
Businesspeople from Toronto
Canadian chief executives
College of William & Mary alumni
University of Toronto alumni
University of Western Ontario alumni